iCarly is an American teen sitcom created by Dan Schneider, which originally aired on Nickelodeon from September 8, 2007, to November 23, 2012. The series tells the story of Carly Shay (Miranda Cosgrove), a teenager who creates and hosts her own web show called iCarly with her best friends Sam and Freddie (Jennette McCurdy and Nathan Kress) in the apartment loft that she and her older brother Spencer (Jerry Trainor) live in. As the web show quickly becomes an internet phenomenon, the characters are tasked with balancing their normal teenage lives with the wacky situations their newfound fame lands them in. By the fourth season, their school friend Gibby (Noah Munck) also works with them on the web show.

Schneider was both the showrunner and executive producer, under his Schneider's Bakery label. During the first five seasons, the show was taped at Nickelodeon on Sunset before relocating to KTLA Studios in Hollywood for the sixth and final season. It was nominated for an Emmy award for Outstanding Children's Program five times. Although the show received mixed reviews from critics, it became popular with audiences. The January 2010 episode "iSaved Your Life" reached 11.2 million viewers, the second most viewed telecast in Nickelodeon history.

In December 2020, a revival of the series was ordered by Paramount+ with Cosgrove, Kress and Trainor returning. The revival series premiered on June 17, 2021.

Plot
When Carly and her best friend Sam improvise comedy at a school talent show audition, tech-savvy Freddie records it and posts it online without informing them. After seeing the girls' strong chemistry and banter, the online audience clamors for more, and thus they decide to create iCarly. The trio find their normal adolescent lives thrown for a loop when they discover that they have become online sensations as their show – which features talent contests, recipes, problem-solving, and random dancing – garners international accolades.

Carly lives in Seattle with her adult brother and guardian Spencer and produces the show in a makeshift third-floor studio loft in their apartment. Their father, Steven Shay, is a United States Air Force officer stationed on a submarine and is often mentioned, but is only seen during the series' finale episode, "iGoodbye".

Characters

Main

 Carly Shay (Miranda Cosgrove) is the host of her own popular web show, iCarly, which she produces with her two best friends, Sam and Freddie.
 Sam Puckett (Jennette McCurdy) is one of Carly's best friends and co-host of iCarly.
 Freddie Benson (Nathan Kress) is also one of Carly's good friends and neighbor. He is the technical producer of iCarly.
 Spencer Shay (Jerry Trainor) is Carly's older brother and legal guardian.
 Gibby (Noah Munck) (recurring role: seasons 1–3; main role: seasons 4–6) is an odd friend of Carly, Sam, and Freddie.

Recurring
 Marissa Benson (Mary Scheer) is Freddie's overbearing and overprotective mother (often referred to by Sam as Freddie's "freakish mother").
 Charlotte (Deena Dill) is Gibby's and Guppy's loving and sometimes overprotective mother. Charlotte dates Spencer, but after their breakup, she tries to avoid him. She is a doting mother and often embarrasses Gibby.
 Lewbert Sline (Jeremy Rowley) is the doorman for the building in which Carly, Spencer, and Freddie live, characterized by his annoying, protective behavior and a large wart on his face. He is often being pranked on iCarly.
 Nevel Papperman (Reed Alexander) is a critic who runs the nevelocity.com website, a site that reviews other websites, including iCarly.com. He is Carly's nemesis and has constantly tried to sabotage iCarly in exchange for a kiss from Carly.
 T-Bo (BooG!e) is the manager at the Groovy Smoothie. He often annoys customers into buying random foods (i.e. bell peppers, bagels, tacos), which are always impaled on a stick. Starting in "iQ", he began renting a room from Freddie's mother.
 Guppy (Ethan Munck) is Gibby's younger brother and often tags along with Gibby.
 Chuck Chambers (Ryan Ochoa) is a child in the Shays' apartment building who frequently torments Spencer.
 Principal Ted Franklin (Tim Russ) is the principal at Ridgeway Secondary School, the school where Carly, Sam, and Freddie attend. He is very lenient and is also a big fan of iCarly.
 Ms. Francine Briggs (Mindy Sterling) is a very strict English teacher at Ridgeway Secondary School who shows an obvious dislike for children.
 Mr. Howard (David St. James) is a strict and unenthusiastic teacher who hates almost everything including his wife.
 Nora Dershlit (Danielle Morrow) is an obsessive and insane iCarly fan with a chicken named Maurice. In the past, she had trapped the Carly cast in her home against their will. She has made appearances on the episodes "iPsycho" and "iStillPsycho". She also appeared in an episode of Sam & Cat titled "#SuperPsycho".

Production

Development
iCarly is the fourth series created by Dan Schneider for Nickelodeon. Schneider originally wanted to make a new TV series starring Miranda Cosgrove; the original idea of the show was that she plays a normal girl who, in a twist of fate, gets cast to star in her favorite TV show, Starstruck. However, during a casual meeting in his den with his wife and his friend Steve, Schneider decided that it would be much better if Carly had her own show – a web show she could run herself and do whatever she wanted to do. In November 2006, Schneider then scrapped his Starstruck script and began developing a new pilot called iCarly during December. The pilot was filmed in January 2007. The series was filmed at the Nickelodeon on Sunset (now Earl Carroll Theatre). The exterior shots of the Shays' apartment building, Bushwell Plaza, are digitally altered images of the Eastern Columbia Building in Los Angeles.

During production of Zoey 101, Schneider came up with the idea of the show and its name with his friend and producer of The Big Bang Theory, Steven Molaro. He was trying to think of a good title for the new series about kids who start their own web show. The pilot script followed a lead girl named "Sam" but the URL for iSam was already taken. Schneider tried other girls' names and bought the URL for iJosie, but eventually changed it to iCarly and enjoyed the name for the lead character. The names of the lead girls were then changed from Sam and Kira to Carly and Sam.

Last seasons
In late January 2011, while doing press for her North American Dancing Crazy concert tour, Miranda Cosgrove began telling news sources that she was looking forward to returning to Hollywood to begin filming a fifth season of iCarly. On January 27, 2011, Cosgrove told Cleveland Live News "We're getting ready to start the next season, right after the tour. I would be willing to do the show as long as people like it and as long as it works." On January 28, 2011, Reuters news agency also reported that Cosgrove was preparing to begin filming a fifth season of iCarly, and on February 3, 2011, Cosgrove told The Middletown Press, when speaking of the show and her co-stars Jennette McCurdy and Nathan Kress, "I've known them since I was little. I can't wait to get back. I'm really comfortable doing iCarly. It's like my home away from home." Cosgrove concluded her Dancing Crazy concert tour on February 24, 2011, and Jennette McCurdy finished her Generation Love mall tour on April 14, 2011. The entire cast did not even get together until the 2011 Kids' Choice Awards. Cosgrove confirmed that filming would resume shortly. At the 2011 Kids' Choice Awards, Jerry Trainor stated that filming would resume in May.

On April 14, 2011, Nickelodeon officially announced the fifth and final production season renewal of iCarly to begin in 2012 with the episodes airing later that year. These episodes would air as the show's sixth season due to the second season production of 45 episodes being split into two broadcast seasons. The third production season originally consisted of 26 episodes as ordered in early 2010; however, half that number was shot from May to September 2010 that aired as the show's fourth season. Dan Schneider then shot the next half in May to July 2011 which became a whole new season production that aired as the show's fifth season later that year. However, due to Miranda's leave for a tour on July 15, 2011, only eleven episodes were produced and the last two were held over and produced during filming of the show's final season.

The final season began on March 24, 2012, with a total of fifteen episodes produced and the final production ending in June of that same year. However, there was a four-month hiatus after six episodes of the season aired from March to June. "iShock America" was promoted as the start of the "final season" of iCarly, effectively splitting the season into two parts. The series ended on November 23, 2012, with the episode "iGoodbye".

Revival

On December 9, 2020, it was announced that Paramount+ had ordered a revival of the series, with Cosgrove, Kress, and Trainor returning and Schneider not being involved with the production of the series. Jay Kogen and Ali Schouten signed on to develop the series. McCurdy suggested during her podcast that she will not reprise her role on the series, as she has left the acting profession and felt embarrassed by her past career. On February 25, 2021, it was reported that Kogen left the project due to "creative differences" with Cosgrove. On March 18, 2021, the show officially entered production, with Laci Mosley playing Carly's new best friend and roommate Harper, and Jaidyn Triplett playing Freddie's stepdaughter Millicent. The series premiered on June 17, 2021.

According to DiscussingFilm, the series revival will take place 10 years after the original Nickelodeon show, following Carly's journey through her twenties alongside returning characters played by Jerry Trainor and Nathan Kress. Jennette McCurdy's Sam is not expected to return with the show reportedly set to introduce a new best friend character in her place. The best friend/roommate will "be part of the LGBTQ+ community as a pansexual character who dreams of becoming a fashion stylist after her wealthy family lost all of their money." The series will also introduce Freddie's social media-obsessed stepdaughter who sees Carly as "washed up" and as competition to her own growing influencer status.

Work environment allegations
In her 2022 memoir, I'm Glad My Mom Died, McCurdy described iCarly as an unsafe work environment, alleging that someone she referred to only as "The Creator" had subjected the cast and crew to frequent emotional abuse, pressured her into underage drinking, massaged her nonconsensually, and was eventually barred from interacting directly with the cast in response to complaints about his behavior. Shortly after McCurdy's allegations were made, Buzzfeed News and Vox both identified Schneider as "The Creator". McCurdy has claimed that after working with Nickelodeon, she turned down "hush money" from the network, which had been allegedly offered to her on the condition that she remain silent about her experiences with Schneider. She expressed outrage at the offer, writing in her memoir, "This is a network with shows made for children. Shouldn't they have some sort of moral compass? Shouldn't they at least try to report to some sort of ethical standard?" Both Schneider and Nickelodeon have turned down requests for comment.

Episodes

Special episodes

Television film

On November 8, 2008, iGo to Japan, the film based on iCarly, premiered on Nickelodeon. It has also been broadcast divided in three-parts of second season that serve as the first film of the series. The television movie stars Miranda Cosgrove, Jennette McCurdy, Nathan Kress and Jerry Trainor. The film was directed by Steve Hoefer. The production of the film began in the spring of 2008, and lasted around 4 to 5 weeks. In the story, after the iCarly crew is nominated for "Best Comedy Category," Carly, Sam, Freddie, Spencer, and Mrs. Benson fly away to Japan to attend the iWeb Awards show. However, their trip soon turns into an adventure with many twists after meeting with their competing webshow hosts Kyoko and Yuki.

Crossover film

Broadcast

International
Worldwide, the series aired on Nickelodeon. In Canada, it premiered on October 8, 2007, on YTV and on November 2, 2009, on the original channel, and ended on December 1, 2012, on the former. In Australia and New Zealand it premiered on October 29, 2007, and ended on April 13, 2013. It premiered on March 8, 2008, and ended on April 5, 2013, in the United Kingdom and Ireland. In Pakistan it premiered on Nickelodeon Pakistan on March 11, 2011, and in India it premiered on TeenNick on January 23, 2013.

Reruns
The show has been frequently rerun on TeenNick since it ended its run on Nickelodeon.

Home media
Note: The season DVDs are released according to the five production seasons.

Reception

Critical
iCarly received mixed reviews from critics but positive reception from audiences. Carey Bryson of About.com gave the show 2 1/2 stars, concluding "The show's comedic elements don't all rest on the irreverent, though, there are some clever storylines and even a few touching moments. Overall, the show has some great comedy, interesting stories, and fun actors." The show was awarded 3 stars by Common Sense Media reviewer Emily Ashby, who said that "[t]he show isn't designed to be educational, per se, but young viewers will learn a bit about interacting with media."

Hollywood.com's Michelle Lee said, "Like the Lost fan rejecting every Lost-like show that came after it, I resented all of the shaky single-camera docu-style comedies that came after [Arrested Development]. Because, frankly, my favorite dead show did it better. I needed something completely different to break me out of my comedy funk and get me back on that horse. And it worked."

U.S. television ratings
The pilot episode debuted on Nickelodeon on September 8, 2007, to an audience of 4.1 million viewers, followed by the second episode "iWant More Viewers" on the same day with 3.9 million viewers. The most-watched episode is "iSaved Your Life" which aired January 18, 2010, to 11.2 million viewers which is also the second most-viewed telecast in Nickelodeon history. On June 9, 2012, iCarly had the lowest viewership of a premiere ever, with only 2.4 million viewers.

Awards and nominations
In 2010 and 2011 debuted the Kids Choice Awards Latin America, Kids Choice Awards México, and Kids Choice Awards Argentina. These awards are new.

iCarly was part of these awards (Mexico Kids Choice Awards, Kids Choice Awards Argentina) because the series still did not finish until 2012.

Other media

Music
Columbia Records and Nickelodeon Records have released an eponymous soundtrack for the show, entitled iCarly. It includes the theme song and four original songs by Miranda Cosgrove, several tracks by guest artists, and cast dialogue. A follow-up soundtrack, titled iCarly: iSoundtrack II, was released January 24, 2012.

Website
The iCarly.com website when accessed outside the show contained many promotional videos by the cast (as their respective characters), as well as content created and sent in by viewers. Other features on the site included characters' blogs, pictures from the set, songs, games, and comments from viewers. Many fictional websites from this show were redirected to this page. For example, web search engine "zaplook.com", video platform "splashface.com", user-generated cartoon repository "ToonJuice", online shop e-commerce site "craigsmix.com", nevelocity.com, GirlyCow.com, WebFlicks.com, RadioDingo.com, PillowMyHead.com, AggressiveParenting.com, SamPuckett.com, TheValerieShow.com, SendMeaSack.com, Beavecoon.org, NeverWatchiCarly.com, iSnarly.com, SprayYourChildren.com, WhatsWrongWithMyBody.com, and any other website mentioned on the show redirected to that page. The website closed down on April 4, 2018. Since then, iCarly.com now redirects to the iCarly information page on the Nickelodeon website.

Video games
An animated PC hidden object game, iCarly: iDream in Toons, was released by Nickelodeon in 2009. Jerry Trainor is the only actor from the cast who lends his voice to the game, the rest of the characters' speech being dubbed with typing sounds on a keyboard.

On May 13, 2009, Nickelodeon announced they had reached an agreement with Activision to produce an iCarly video game for the Nintendo DS and Wii. The game was released on October 28, 2009. The cast lent their voices in the videogame. A sequel, iCarly 2: iJoin the Click!, was released on November 16, 2010, for the same platforms.

On December 4, 2009, an app was released for iPhone and iPod Touch titled "Sam's Remote", consisting of an interactive version of the remote Sam uses on live casts of iCarly in the show, where one pushes different buttons and they make silly sound effects. Available through the iTunes App Store for $1.99 download.

Products
An Apple MacBook and iPhone are parodized with the logo of a pear instead of an Apple. Additionally, the "Pear Phone" is pear-shaped.

Spin-off series

Two spin-off series have been proposed as pilots for Nickelodeon, and were both announced during the network's presentation at the Television Critics Association Summer Press Tour on August 3, 2012.

The first is Sam & Cat, which paired Ariana Grande from Victorious and Jennette McCurdy together in a traditional "buddy sitcom" setting as their characters, Cat Valentine and Sam Puckett. They played roommates who launch a babysitting business together. The show was picked up by Nickelodeon on November 29, 2012, and premiered on June 8, 2013. The series was cancelled on July 13, 2014, with the final episode airing on July 17.

The second proposed spin-off featured Noah Munck's character Gibby Gibson into a self-titled sitcom named Gibby where the character works at a recreation center as a mentor to four middle school students. Even though a pilot was filmed, Gibby was not picked up as a series, and the pilot episode has never aired. The script was released in 2021.

See also
 Drake & Josh

Notes

References

External links
 
 Nickelodeon page
 YTV (Canada) website
 Paramount+ page
 

 
2007 American television series debuts
2012 American television series endings
2000s American high school television series
2010s American high school television series
2000s American teen sitcoms
2010s American teen sitcoms
2000s Nickelodeon original programming
2010s Nickelodeon original programming
English-language television shows
Television controversies in the United States
Television series about teenagers
Television series created by Dan Schneider
Television series by Schneider's Bakery
Television shows set in Seattle
Middle school television series
Television series about siblings
Television series about social media